Onalaska is a city in La Crosse County, Wisconsin, United States. The population was 18,803 at the 2020 census. It borders the larger La Crosse, Wisconsin, and is a part of the La Crosse-Onalaska, WI-MN Metropolitan Area.

Onalaska is built on a slightly elevated ridge above the Black River.  Natural areas include both river bottom land and high, heavily wooded, scenic bluffs. A man-made reservoir at the city's western edge is known as Lake Onalaska. Onalaska is known as "The Sunfish Capital of the World."

History
The original village (now city) was platted by Thomas G. Rowe (New York) and John C. Laird (Pennsylvania) in 1851. In its early days, lumbering and related industries served as a basis for its economy.

The name for the city comes from the poem "The Pleasures of Hope", by the Scottish poet Thomas Campbell. The original spelling of the name in Campbell's poem was "Oonalaska" (an Aleutian island and fishing village).

Other places named Onalaska are in Arkansas (now defunct), Texas and Washington; they are historically linked to one another through the lumber industry. In Alaska, the modern day city of Unalaska and Unalaska Island are linked to the Onalaskas through Thomas Campbell's poem. Unalaska is the original Oonalaska or Onalaska or "Ounalashka" (Russian spelling) immortalized by Campbell.

Geography

Onalaska lies immediately north of La Crosse, on the Black River. It is the second-largest city in La Crosse County, Wisconsin.

Named streams within the current corporate limits of the city include the Black River, the La Crosse River and Sand Lake Coulee Creek. In the 1930s, the construction of Lake Onalaska resulted in the flooding and eventual disappearance of a shallow, natural body of water, Rice Lake, and several smaller ponds in the Black River bottoms area.

Brice Prairie is an urban reserve area within the City of Onalaska, located below the ridge on which most of the city is situated. It lies to the northwest of the city's current northern border and is directly on Lake Onalaska.

Demographics

2020 census
As of the census of 2020, the population was 18,803. The racial makeup of the city was 84.6% White, 8.0% Asian, 1.1% Black or African American, 0.4% Native American, 0.9% from other races, and 4.9% from two or more races. Ethnically, the population was 2.6% Hispanic or Latino of any race.

2013 income statistics
According to 2009–2013 ACS estimates, the median household income was $55,982 and the median family income was $74,182. Males had a median income of $47,745 versus $35,292 for females. The per capita income for the city was $31,491. About 3.4% of families and 6.8% of the population were below the poverty line, including 8.1% of those under age 18 and 11.1% of those age 65 or over.

2010 census

As of the census of 2010, there were 17,736 people, 7,331 households, and 4,792 families living in the city. The racial makeup of the city was 90.7% White, 1.1% African American, 0.3% Native American, 5.7% Asian, 0.5% from other races, and 1.7% from two or more races. Hispanic or Latino of any race were 1.6% of the population.

There were 7,331 households, of which 31.9% had children under the age of 18 living with them, 52.5% were married couples living together, 9.1% had a female householder with no husband present, 3.8% had a male householder with no wife present, and 34.6% were non-families. 28.0% of all households were made up of individuals, and 11.8% had someone living alone who was 65 years of age or older. The average household size was 2.40 and the average family size was 2.96.

The median age in the city was 38.5 years. 24.9% of residents were under the age of 18; 7.3% were between the ages of 18 and 24; 25.9% were from 25 to 44; 26.5% were from 45 to 64; and 15.3% were 65 years of age or older. The gender makeup of the city was 48.0% male and 52.0% female.

2000 census

As of the census of 2000, there were 14,839 people, 5,893 households, and 4,036 families living in the city. The population density was 1,631.6 people per square mile (630.3/km2). There were 6,070 housing units at an average density of 667.4 per square mile (257.8/km2). The racial makeup of the city was 95.17% White, 0.63% Black or African American, 0.20% Native American, 2.80% Asian, 0.25% from other races, and 0.95% from two or more races. 0.95% of the population were Hispanic or Latino of any race.

There were 5,893 households, out of which 33.8% had children under the age of 18 living with them, 57.0% were married couples living together, 8.6% had a female householder with no husband present, and 31.5% were non-families. 24.4% of all households were made up of individuals, and 7.4% had someone living alone who was 65 years of age or older. The average household size was 2.50 and the average family size was 3.00.

In the city, the population was spread out, with 26.2% under the age of 18, 8.8% from 18 to 24, 29.9% from 25 to 44, 23.9% from 45 to 64, and 11.3% who were 65 years of age or older. The median age was 36 years. For every 100 females, there were 93.8 males. For every 100 females age 18 and over, there were 90.0 males.

The median income for a household in the city was $47,800, and the median income for a family was $57,264. Males had a median income of $41,335 versus $25,316 for females. The per capita income for the city was $24,066. About 4.5% of families and 6.2% of the population were below the poverty line, including 7.7% of those under age 18 and 5.4% of those age 65 or over.

Education

Onalaska is served by two school districts, Onalaska and Holmen. Onalaska School District schools include Onalaska High School, Onalaska Middle School, Eagle Bluff Elementary School, Northern Hills Elementary School and Irving Pertzsch Elementary School.

Parochial schools in the city include Luther High School, a Lutheran high school of the Wisconsin Evangelical Lutheran Synod, St. Patrick Elementary School, part of La Crosse Aquinas Catholic Schools, and St. Pauls Lutheran School, serving grades Pre-K through 8.

Media
Onalaska's newspaper is the Onalaska/Holmen Courier-Life.
Onalaska's tourism Instagram is @discoveronalaska

Economy
 Onalaska Omni Center is Onalaska's convention center and indoor arena. It is the second largest convention center in southwest Wisconsin, after the La Crosse Center.

Transportation
Onalaska is served by the La Crosse Municipal Transit Utility, which provides public transit on three routes in Onalaska. Until 1963, Onalaska had a train station which served the Dakota 400.

Gallery of Historic Places
Buildings, sites, structures, districts, and objects in Onalaska listed on the National Register of Historic Places

Notable people

 Biddy Dolan, MLB player
 Tim Gullikson, tennis player
 Carlie Hanson, singer-songwriter
 Theresa Knutson, ice hockey player
 Ken Kratz (born ), lawyer, former district attorney of Calumet County, Wisconsin; law license was suspended for four months after sexting scandal
 Sandra Lee, television chef
 Shane Mauss, stand-up comedian
 Tom Newberry, football player
 Frank Pooler (Wisconsin politician), Wisconsin businessman, state legislator, mayor of Onalaska
 Frank Pooler, choral director and songwriter ("Merry Christmas Darling")
 Mark Proksch, actor and comedian
 Clayton Rand, journalist and writer
 Harry W. Schilling, farmer, Wisconsin state legislator
 William H. Stevenson, U.S. Representative
 Matt Thomas, professional basketball player
 Leila Usher, artist

Images

References

External links

 City of Onalaska
 
 La Crosse Convention & Visitors Bureau

Cities in Wisconsin
Cities in La Crosse County, Wisconsin
Populated places established in 1851
1851 establishments in Wisconsin